The 2019 IIHF World Championship Division II was an international ice hockey tournament run by the International Ice Hockey Federation.

The Group A tournament was held in Belgrade, Serbia, from 9 to 15 April, and the Group B tournament in México City, Mexico, from 21 to 27 April 2019.

Serbia and Israel won the Group A and B tournaments, and were promoted, while Belgium and North Korea finished last and were relegated. Israel's Eliezer Sherbatov was the scoring leader, with 15 points.

Group A tournament

Participants

Match officials
4 referees and 7 linesmen were selected for the tournament.

Standings

Results
All times are local (UTC+2).

Awards and statistics

Awards
Best players selected by the directorate:
Best Goalkeeper:  Vilim Rosandić
Best Defenseman:  Shaone Morrisonn
Best Forward:  Mirko Đumić
Source: IIHF.com

Scoring leaders
List shows the top skaters sorted by points, then goals.

GP = Games played; G = Goals; A = Assists; Pts = Points; +/− = Plus/minus; PIM = Penalties in minutes; POS = Position
Source: IIHF.com

Goaltending leaders
Only the top five goaltenders, based on save percentage, who have played at least 40% of their team's minutes, are included in this list.

TOI = Time on ice (minutes:seconds); SA = Shots against; GA = Goals against; GAA = Goals against average; Sv% = Save percentage; SO = Shutouts
Source: IIHF.com

Group B tournament

Participants

Match officials
4 referees and 7 linesmen were selected for the tournament.

Standings

Results
All times are local (UTC−5).

Awards and statistics

Awards
Best players selected by the directorate:
Best Goalkeeper:  Dennis Hedström
Best Defenseman:  Stefan Amston
Best Forward:  Eliezer Sherbatov
Source: IIHF.com

Scoring leaders
List shows the top skaters sorted by points, then goals.

GP = Games played; G = Goals; A = Assists; Pts = Points; +/− = Plus/minus; PIM = Penalties in minutes; POS = Position
Source: IIHF.com

Goaltending leaders
Only the top five goaltenders, based on save percentage, who have played at least 40% of their team's minutes, are included in this list.

TOI = Time on ice (minutes:seconds); SA = Shots against; GA = Goals against; GAA = Goals against average; Sv% = Save percentage; SO = Shutouts
Source: IIHF.com

References

External links
Group A website
Group B website

2019
Division II
2019 IIHF World Championship Division II
2019 IIHF World Championship Division II
International sports competitions in Belgrade
2019
2019 in Serbian sport
2019 in Mexican sports
April 2019 sports events in Europe
2010s in Belgrade